State Route 111 (SR 111) is a  state highway in Elmore and Autauga counties in the central part of the U.S. state of Alabama. The southern terminus of the highway is at an intersection with SR 212 in Wetumpka. The northern terminus of the highway is at an intersection with SR 143 west of Coosa River.

Route description
SR 111 begins at an intersection with SR 212 in Wetumpka. About  later, it intersects SR 14. After crossing Jordan Lake, SR 111 travels through Holtville. SR 111 enters Autauga County before it reaches the northern terminus, an intersection with SR 143 west of Coosa River.

Major intersections

Truck route

State Route 111 Truck  (SR 111 Truck) is a truck route of SR 111 in Wetumpka. It travels from SR 14 to U.S. Route 231 (US 231; also unsigned SR 53). The truck route stays on SR 14 the entire routing, known as Coosa River Parkway. SR 111 Truck crosses the Coosa River before ending at US 231.

See also

References

External links

111
Transportation in Elmore County, Alabama
Autauga County